Deepwater Horizon was an ultra-deepwater, dynamically positioned, semi-submersible offshore drilling rig owned by Transocean and operated by BP. The fire was inextinguishable and, two days later, on 22 April, the Horizon sank, leaving the well gushing at the seabed and causing the largest marine oil spill in history.

Built in 2001 in South Korea by Hyundai Heavy Industries, the rig was commissioned by R&B Falcon (a later asset of Transocean), registered in Majuro, and leased to BP from 2001 until September 2013.

Design

Deepwater Horizon was the second semi-submersible rig constructed of a class of two, although Deepwater Nautilus, its predecessor, is not dynamically positioned. Its American Bureau of Shipping (ABS) class notations were "A1, Column Stabilized Drilling Unit, AMS, ACCU, DPS-3".

In 2002, the rig was upgraded with "e-drill", a drill monitoring system whereby technical personnel based in Houston, Texas, received real-time drilling data from the rig and transmitted maintenance and troubleshooting information.

Advanced systems played a key role in the rig's operation, from pressure and drill monitoring technology, to automated shutoff systems and modelling systems for cementing. The OptiCem cement modelling system, used by Halliburton in April 2010, played a crucial part in cement slurry mix and support decisions. These decisions became a focus for investigations into the explosion on the rig that month.

History

Construction and ownership
Deepwater Horizon was built for R&B Falcon (which later became part of Transocean) by Hyundai Heavy Industries in Ulsan, South Korea. Construction started in December 1998, the keel was laid on 21 March 2000, and the rig was delivered on 23 February 2001, after the acquisition of R&B Falcon by Transocean. Until 29 December 2004 the rig was registered in the Republic of Panama.

Transocean, through its Steinhausen, Switzerland subsidiary Triton Asset Leasing GmbH, operated the rig under the Marshallese flag of convenience. The rig was leased to BP on a 3-year contract for deployment in the Gulf of Mexico following construction. The lease was renewed in 2004 for a year, 2005 for 5 years, and 2009 for 3 years covering 2010 to 2013. The last contract was worth $544 million, or $496,800 a day, for a "bare rig", with crew, gear and support vessels estimated to cost the same.

, the rig was insured for  covering the replacement cost and wreckage removal.

Drilling operations
Deepwater Horizon worked on wells in the Atlantis (BP 56%, BHP 44%) and Thunder Horse (BP 75%, ExxonMobil 25%) oil fields. It was described at times as a "lucky" and "celebrated" rig, and in 2007 was still described as "one of the most powerful rigs in the world". In 2006 it discovered oil in the Kaskida oil field, and in 2009 the "giant" Tiber oil field. The well was the deepest oil well in the world, and more than  farther below the seabed than the rig's official drilling specification stated on the company's fleet list.

The Macondo prospect exploration rights had been acquired by BP in 2009, with the prospect jointly owned by BP (65%), Anadarko Petroleum (25%) and MOEX Offshore 2007 (10%). Deepwater Horizon was still working on the Macondo site on 20 April 2010, when a violent explosion occurred leading to destruction of the rig and the subsequent oil spill. The well was in the final stages of completion after cement had been emplaced for its last casing string. The exploratory work had been described as "concluded" with permission already having been requested from MMS to terminate operations at the Macondo site. The rig was scheduled to move to its next roles as semi-permanent production platforms, initially at the Tiber site followed by a return to the Kaskida field, an oil dome 50 miles off the coast of Louisiana.

During its operational lifetime, the rig was actively in operation for 93% of its working life (2,896 of 3,131 days). The remainder partly was time spent moving between sites.

Regulation, safety, and inspection 
The Minerals Management Service (renamed on 18 June 2010 to the Bureau of Ocean Energy Management, Regulation and Enforcement, or Bureau of Ocean Energy (BOE)) is the regulatory and inspecting body for offshore oil drilling and rigs in the United States of America. According to an Associated Press investigation, certain safety documentation and emergency procedure information, including documentation for the exact incident that later occurred, was absent. The exact number of required monthly inspections performed varied over time; the inspections were carried out as required for the first 40 months, but after that around 25% of inspections were omitted, although the investigation notes this is partly expected, since there are circumstances such as weather and movement which preclude an inspection. Reports of the last three inspections for 2010 were provided under Freedom of Information legislation. Each of these inspections had taken two hours or less.

During its lifetime the rig received 5 citations for non-compliance, 4 of which were in 2002 (safety, including the blowout preventer) and the other in 2003 (pollution). A sixth citation in 2007 related to non-grounded electrical equipment was later withdrawn when the equipment was determined to be compliant with regulations. Overall the Deepwater Horizon safety record was "strong" according to a drilling consultant reviewing the information. In 2009 the Minerals Management Service "herald[ed] the Deepwater Horizon as an industry model for safety". According to AP's investigation "its record was so exemplary, according to MMS officials, that the rig was never on inspectors' informal 'watch list' for problem rigs".

Explosion and oil spill

At  CDT on 20 April 2010, during the final phases of drilling the exploratory well off the gulf of Mexico, a geyser of seawater erupted from the marine riser onto the rig, shooting 70 m into the air.  This was soon followed by the eruption of a slushy combination of drilling mud, methane gas, and water. The gas component of the slushy material quickly transitioned into a fully gaseous state and then ignited into a series of explosions and then a firestorm. An attempt was made to activate the blowout preventer, but it failed. The final defense to prevent an oil spill, a device known as a blind shear ram, was activated but failed to plug the well.

Ten workers were presumed killed in the initial explosion: Karl Kleppinger Jr., 38, Natchez, Mississippi; Dewey Revette, 48, of State Line, Mississippi; Shane Roshto, 22, Liberty, Mississippi; Donald Clark, 49, of Newellton, Louisiana; Stephen Ray Curtis, 40, of Georgetown, Louisiana; Gordon Jones, 28, of Baton Rouge, Louisiana; Roy Wyatt Kemp, 27, Jonesville, Louisiana; Keith Blair Manuel, 56, of Gonzales, Louisiana; Adam Weise, 24, Yorktown, Texas; Jason Anderson, 35, of Midfield, Texas. An eleventh was crane operator Aaron Dale Burkeen, 37, Philadelphia, Mississippi, who died in the subsequent fire. 

The rig was evacuated, with injured workers airlifted to medical facilities. After approximately 36 hours, Deepwater Horizon sank on 22 April 2010. The remains of the rig were located resting on the seafloor approximately 1,500 m deep at that location, and about 400 m northwest of the well.

The resultant oil spill continued until 15 July when it was closed by a cap. Relief wells were used to permanently seal the well, which was declared "effectively dead" on 19 September 2010. NOAA established the Gulf Spill Restoration project, under the Deep Water Horizon National Resource Damage Assessment Trustees, to help to restore much of the coastline.

Aftermath

Transocean received an early partial insurance settlement for total loss of the Deepwater Horizon of  around 5 May 2010.

Litigation, ultimate roll call of damage, and the scope of final insurance recovery were all unknown , with analysts reporting that the aftermath was of unprecedented scale and complexity compared to previous disasters which themselves took many years to unfold and resolve. A July 2010 analysis by the Financial Times on the aftermath cited legal sources as saying that "at some point the scale of the litigation becomes so large that it really is novel", that "the situation is likely to be complicated further because the variety of probable cases means it will be hard to aggregate them into so-called class actions" and that there was "no way to put this in historical context because we have never faced anything like this before". As with the Exxon Valdez disaster, litigation was being discussed in terms of a 20-year timescale.

In January 2013, Transocean agreed to pay US$1.4 billion for violations of the US Clean Water Act. BP had earlier agreed to pay $2.4 billion but faced additional penalties that could range from $5 billion to $20 billion. In September 2014, Halliburton agreed to settle a large percentage of legal claims against them by paying $1.1 billion into a trust by way of three installments over two years. On 4 September 2014, U.S. District Judge Carl Barbier ruled BP was guilty of gross negligence and willful misconduct under the Clean Water Act (CWA). He described BP's actions as "reckless," while he said Transocean's and Halliburton's actions were "negligent." He apportioned 67% of the blame for the spill to BP, 30% to Transocean, and 3% to Halliburton. BP issued a statement strongly disagreeing with the finding, and saying the court's decision would be appealed.

On 8 December 2014, The US Supreme Court rejected BP's legal challenge to a compensation deal over the 2010 Gulf of Mexico oil spill.  The settlement agreement had no cap, but BP initially estimated that it would pay roughly $7.8bn (£6.1bn) to compensate victims.

Film

The biographical disaster movie Deepwater Horizon, released in 2016, depicts the events of the 2010 Deepwater Horizon explosion and subsequent oil spill. The film is based on "Deepwater Horizon's Final Hours", an article appearing in The New York Times.

See also

 Ixtoc I oil spill
 Ocean Ranger
 Piper Alpha
 Tony Hayward

References

External links

 Transocean official website
 Deepwater Horizon detail at Transocean's website and at RigZone.com
 Photograph of Deepwater Horizon in 2004 at Geographic.org
 
  – detailed media description of the events of the day of the Deepwater Horizon explosion (yahoo news mirror)
 Photo history of the fire and loss
 BOEM reading room on Deepwater Horizon, including Freedom of Information publications
 Video explaining the events leading up to the Deepwater Horizon explosion and how it affected the region.

2001 ships
Collapsed oil platforms
Deepwater Horizon oil spill
Drilling rigs
Semi-submersibles
Ships of the Marshall Islands
Ships built by Hyundai Heavy Industries Group
Transocean
Ships of BP